Peder Tonning (14 January 1782 – 3 May 1839) was a Norwegian politician.

He was the son of the wealthy merchant Ole Tonning in Stryn, but moved to Aalesund. When local government was introduced in Norway in 1837, Tonning became the first mayor of the city.

He was elected to the Norwegian Parliament in 1814 and 1830, representing the constituency of Romsdals Amt (today named Møre og Romsdal). He was also a deputy representative in 1821. He worked as postmaster.

References

1782 births
1839 deaths
Members of the Storting
Mayors of places in Møre og Romsdal
Politicians from Ålesund